WBQB is an adult contemporary formatted broadcast radio station licensed to Fredericksburg, Virginia, serving Central Virginia.  WBQB is owned and operated by Centennial Broadcasting.

References

External links
B101.5 Online

1960 establishments in Virginia
Mainstream adult contemporary radio stations in the United States
Radio stations established in 1960
BQB